Fundy Isles was a provincial electoral district for the Legislative Assembly of New Brunswick, Canada.

It was created in 1994 from Charlotte West and Charlotte-Fundy and was dissolved in 2006 into Charlotte-The Isles and Charlotte-Campobello.

Members of the Legislative Assembly

Election results

External links 
Website of the Legislative Assembly of New Brunswick
Bay of Fundy Isles

Former provincial electoral districts of New Brunswick